Eloy is a given name which may refer to:

Saint Eligius or Eloy (588–660), Christian saint and bishop
Eloy Alfaro (1842–1912), President of Ecuador from 1895 to 1901 and from 1906 to 1911
Eloy Álvarez (1896–1951), Argentine actor
Eloy d'Amerval (fl. 1455–1508), French Renaissance composer, singer, choirmaster and poet
Eloy Azorin (born 1977), Spanish actor
Eloy Campos (born 1942), Peruvian former footballer
Eloy Cantú Segovia (born 1952), Mexican politician
Eloy Casagrande (born 1991), Brazilian drummer, currently in the Brazilian thrash metal act Sepultura
Eloy Cavazos (born 1949), Mexican matador
Eloy Colombano (born 1983), Argentine footballer
Eloy Edu (born 1985), footballer in Spain from Equatorial Guinea
Eloy Fariña Núñez (1885–1929), Paraguayan poet, writer and journalist
Eloy Fritsch (born 1968), Brazilian musician and composer of the progressive rock band Apocalypse and solo
Eloy Fominaya (1925–2002), American composer, educator, conductor, violinist and luthier
Eloy Gila (born 1988), Spanish footballer known simply as Eloy
Eloy Gutiérrez Menoyo (1934–2012), Cuban guerrilla leader
Eloy de la Iglesia (1944–2006), Spanish screenwriter and film director
Eloy Inos (born 1949), Governor of the Northern Mariana Islands
Eloy Jiménez (born 1996), Dominican baseball player
Eloy Tato Losada (born 1923), Spanish Roman Catholic former bishop
Andrés Eloy Martínez Rojas (born 1963), Mexican astronomer, scientist and politician
Tomás Eloy Martinez (1934–2010), Argentine journalist and writer
Eloy Matos (born 1985), Puerto Rican soccer player
Eloy Mestrelle (died 1578), French moneyer who introduced milled coinage to England
Eloy Olaya (born 1964), Spanish retired footballer known mononymously as Eloy
Eloy Palacios (1847–1919), Venezuelan artist, sculptor and painter
Eloy Pérez (born 1986), Mexican-American boxer
Eloy Pruystinck (died 1544), Dutch radical Anabaptist leader
Eloy Rodriguez (born 1947), Mexican-American biochemist and professor
Eloy Rojas (born 1967), Venezuelan boxer
Eloy Room (born 1989), Dutch-Curaçaoan football goalkeeper
Eloy Salgado (born 1970), American retired soccer player
Eloy Teruel (born 1982), Spanish cyclist
Eloy G. Ureta (1892–1965), Peruvian brigadier general
Eloy Urroz (born 1967), Mexican writer and professor
Eloy Vargas (born 1988), Dominican basketball player

See also
Eloi (name)

Masculine given names